Skull of a Skeleton with Burning Cigarette is an early work by Vincent van Gogh. The small and undated oil-on-canvas painting featuring a skeleton and cigarette is part of the permanent collection of the Van Gogh Museum in Amsterdam. It was most likely painted in the winter of 1885–86 as a satirical comment on conservative academic practices. Before it was common to use live humans as models, the academic routine included the study of skeletons to develop an understanding of human anatomy. Van Gogh was in Antwerp, Belgium at that time attending classes at the Royal Academy of Fine Arts, which he later said were boring and taught him nothing.

Van Gogh included skeletons in another work from his Antwerp period, a sketch of a "Hanging skeleton and cat". In 1887–88, van Gogh painted two more paintings with skulls, the only other works of his (besides a drawing from the same period) to use skulls as a motif.

The work measures . It is considered a vanitas or memento mori, at a time when van Gogh himself was in poor health. It may be influenced by works of Hercules Segers, a 17th-century Dutch artist, or of Félicien Rops, a Belgian contemporary of van Gogh. Although often interpreted as a criticism of smoking, Van Gogh was a keen smoker himself, and continued to smoke until his death in 1890.

The painting was held by Van Gogh's brother Theo Van Gogh at the time of his death in 1891. It was inherited by his widow Johanna van Gogh-Bonger until her death in 1925, and then by their son Vincent Willem van Gogh until 1962, when it was acquired by the Van Gogh Foundation. It was on loan to the Stedelijk Museum from 1962 to 1973, and has been on permanent loan to the Van Gogh Museum in Amsterdam since 1973.

See also
List of works by Vincent van Gogh

References

 Head of a Skeleton with a Burning Cigarette, 1886 at the Van Gogh Museum in Amsterdam

External links
 
 

1880s paintings
Paintings about death
Paintings by Vincent van Gogh
Skulls in art
Collections of the Van Gogh Museum
Still life paintings
Memento mori